Archbishop of Perth may refer to:

Anglican Archbishop of Perth
Roman Catholic Archbishop of Perth